Residencia Presidencial de Suárez y Reyes, or simply Residencia de Suárez (Spanish for Suárez Residence), is the official residence of the president of Uruguay, so-called because it is located at the intersection of Suarez and Reyes streets, in Prado, Montevideo. To its back lies the  Montevideo Botanic Garden. It was built during the first presidential term of José Batlle y Ordoñez.

History 
In 1907 the land lot was acquired by Adelina Lerena de Fein at auction. There, the Fein Lerena family ordered the construction of a three-storey house by the young architect Juan María Aubriot, who finished the work in 1908.

After the death of the house owner, the family decided to sell the estate, which was acquired by the German Werner Quincke; He commissioned reforms to the architect Karl Trambauer, who added its characteristic tower. The Quincke family sold it to the Susviela Elejalde family, who were forced to give up their rights to the Montevideo Municipality due to financial problems.

Presidential residence 
In 1925, the young Luis Batlle Berres and Matilde Ibáñez Tálice met while walking in front of this property. Soon after they were married. In 1947, Luis Batlle Berres was already president, and at the suggestion of his wife they chose this mansion as their official residence. They commissioned reforms to the architect Juan Scasso (who designed and built the Centenario Stadium).

Residents of the House 
Several Uruguayan Presidents had their official residents there:
 Luis Batlle Berres (the first president to live at Suarez)
 Andrés Martínez Trueba
 Jorge Pacheco Areco
 Juan María Bordaberry
 Aparicio Méndez
 Gregorio Álvarez
 Julio María Sanguinetti (twice)
 Luis Alberto Lacalle
 Jorge Batlle Ibáñez
 Luis Lacalle Pou
Some others decided not to use it as official residence. For instance: Oscar Gestido, Tabaré Vázquez and José Mujica decided to live in their own private houses.
President elect for the 2020–2025 term, Luis Lacalle Pou, has stated he and his family will move to the residence.

Gallery

References 

Buildings and structures in Montevideo
Presidential residences
Prado, Montevideo